Opisthopsis is a genus of ants in the subfamily Formicinae. Its 13 species are found in Australasia.

Species

Opisthopsis diadematus Wheeler, 1918
Opisthopsis haddoni Emery, 1893
Opisthopsis halmaherae Karavaiev, 1930
Opisthopsis jocosus Wheeler, 1918
Opisthopsis lienosus Wheeler, 1918
Opisthopsis linnaei Forel, 1901
Opisthopsis major Forel, 1902
Opisthopsis manni Wheeler, 1918
Opisthopsis maurus Wheeler, 1918
Opisthopsis panops Bolton, 1995
Opisthopsis pictus Emery, 1895
Opisthopsis respiciens (Smith, 1865)
Opisthopsis rufithorax Emery, 1895

References

External links

Formicinae
Ant genera